Jonathan Moore may refer to:

Jonathan Moore (long jumper) (born 1984), English track & field athlete
Jonathan Moore (basketball) (born 1957), American basketball player, formerly for Furman University
Jonathan Moore (State Department official) (1932–2017), American Director of the Bureau of Refugee Programs, 1987–1989
Jonathan Moore (golfer) (born 1985), American golfer
Jonathan Baker Moore (1825–1889), Wisconsin State Assemblyman and Union Army general
Jonathan Patrick Moore (born 1982), Australian actor
Jon Moore (born 1955), Welsh footballer
Jonathan Moore (musician) (1969–2017), rapper, DJ and producer